Zimbabwe competed at the 2014 Summer Youth Olympics, in Nanjing, China from 16 August to 28 August 2014.

Athletics

Zimbabwe qualified three athletes.

Qualification Legend: Q=Final A (medal); qB=Final B (non-medal); qC=Final C (non-medal); qD=Final D (non-medal); qE=Final E (non-medal)

Boys
Track & road events

Girls
Track & road events

Equestrian

Zimbabwe qualified a rider.

Rowing

Zimbabwe qualified two boats based on its performance at the African Qualification Regatta.

Qualification Legend: FA=Final A (medal); FB=Final B (non-medal); FC=Final C (non-medal); FD=Final D (non-medal); SA/B=Semifinals A/B; SC/D=Semifinals C/D; R=Repechage

Swimming

Zimbabwe qualified two swimmers.

Boys

Girls

Triathlon

Zimbabwe qualified two athletes based on its performance at the 2014 African Youth Olympic Games Qualifier. 

Individual

Relay

See also
Zimbabwe at the 2014 Winter Olympics

References

2014 in Zimbabwean sport
Nations at the 2014 Summer Youth Olympics
Zimbabwe at the Youth Olympics